Francisca Marycarmen Arauna Urrutia (born 15 March 1991) is a Chilean lawyer who was elected as a member of the Chilean Constitutional Convention.

On 2 September 2021,she resigned to The List of the People together with Fernando Salinas Manfredini.

References

External links
 Profile at Lista del Pueblo

Living people
1991 births
Chilean people
Andrés Bello National University alumni
University of the Andes, Chile alumni
21st-century Chilean politicians
Members of the List of the People
Members of the Chilean Constitutional Convention